Vysoky (masculine), Vysokaya (feminine), or Vysokoye (neuter) is the name of several inhabited localities in Russia.

Modern localities

Amur Oblast
As of 2010, two rural localities in Amur Oblast bear this name:
Vysokoye, Mikhaylovsky District, Amur Oblast, a selo in Novochesnokovsky Rural Settlement of Mikhaylovsky District
Vysokoye, Romnensky District, Amur Oblast, a selo in Rogozovsky Rural Settlement of Romnensky District

Arkhangelsk Oblast
As of 2010, two rural localities in Arkhangelsk Oblast bear this name:
Vysokoye, Arkhangelsk Oblast, a village in Yemetsky Selsoviet of Kholmogorsky District
Vysokaya, Arkhangelsk Oblast, a village in Trufanogorsky Selsoviet of Pinezhsky District

Republic of Bashkortostan
As of 2010, one rural locality in the Republic of Bashkortostan bears this name:
Vysokaya, Republic of Bashkortostan, a village in Ulu-Telyaksky Selsoviet of Iglinsky District

Belgorod Oblast
As of 2010, seven rural localities in Belgorod Oblast bear this name:
Vysoky, Gubkinsky District, Belgorod Oblast, a khutor in Gubkinsky District
Vysoky (Utyanskoye Rural Settlement), Krasnogvardeysky District, Belgorod Oblast, a khutor in Krasnogvardeysky District; municipally, a part of Utyanskoye Rural Settlement of that district
Vysoky (Kalinovskoye Rural Settlement), Krasnogvardeysky District, Belgorod Oblast, a khutor in Krasnogvardeysky District; municipally, a part of Kalinovskoye Rural Settlement of that district
Vysoky, Krasnoyaruzhsky District, Belgorod Oblast, a khutor in Krasnoyaruzhsky District
Vysoky, Prokhorovsky District, Belgorod Oblast, a khutor in Prokhorovsky District
Vysoky, Starooskolsky District, Belgorod Oblast, a khutor in Starooskolsky District
Vysokoye, Belgorod Oblast, a selo in Yakovlevsky District

Bryansk Oblast
As of 2010, eight rural localities in Bryansk Oblast bear this name:
Vysoky, Surazhsky District, Bryansk Oblast, a settlement in Dushatinsky Selsoviet of Surazhsky District
Vysoky, Trubchevsky District, Bryansk Oblast, a settlement in Ryabchovsky Selsoviet of Trubchevsky District
Vysokoye, Mglinsky District, Bryansk Oblast, a selo in Vysoksky Selsoviet of Mglinsky District
Vysokoye, Rognedinsky District, Bryansk Oblast, a village in Fedorovsky Selsoviet of Rognedinsky District
Vysokoye (selo), Vysoksky Selsoviet, Unechsky District, Bryansk Oblast, a selo in Vysoksky Selsoviet of Unechsky District
Vysokoye (settlement), Vysoksky Selsoviet, Unechsky District, Bryansk Oblast, a settlement in Vysoksky Selsoviet of Unechsky District
Vysokoye, Norinsky Selsoviet, Zhiryatinsky District, Bryansk Oblast, a village in Norinsky Selsoviet of Zhiryatinsky District
Vysokoye, Vysoksky Selsoviet, Zhiryatinsky District, Bryansk Oblast, a selo in Vysoksky Selsoviet of Zhiryatinsky District

Chelyabinsk Oblast
As of 2010, one rural locality in Chelyabinsk Oblast bears this name:
Vysoky, Chelyabinsk Oblast, a settlement in Poletayevsky Selsoviet of Sosnovsky District

Kaliningrad Oblast
As of 2010, five rural localities in Kaliningrad Oblast bear this name:
Vysokoye, Bagrationovsky District, Kaliningrad Oblast, a settlement in Dolgorukovsky Rural Okrug of Bagrationovsky District
Vysokoye, Guryevsky District, Kaliningrad Oblast, a settlement in Nizovsky Rural Okrug of Guryevsky District
Vysokoye, Krasnoznamensky District, Kaliningrad Oblast, a settlement in Dobrovolsky Rural Okrug of Krasnoznamensky District
Vysokoye, Nesterovsky District, Kaliningrad Oblast, a settlement in Ilyushinsky Rural Okrug of Nesterovsky District
Vysokoye, Slavsky District, Kaliningrad Oblast, a settlement in Bolshakovsky Rural Okrug of Slavsky District

Kaluga Oblast
As of 2010, seven rural localities in Kaluga Oblast bear this name:
Vysokoye, Babyninsky District, Kaluga Oblast, a village in Babyninsky District
Vysokoye, Duminichsky District, Kaluga Oblast, a village in Duminichsky District
Vysokoye, Khvastovichsky District, Kaluga Oblast, a village in Khvastovichsky District
Vysokoye (Mokroye Rural Settlement), Kuybyshevsky District, Kaluga Oblast, a village in Kuybyshevsky District; municipally, a part of Mokroye Rural Settlement of that district
Vysokoye (Vysokoye Rural Settlement), Kuybyshevsky District, Kaluga Oblast, a village in Kuybyshevsky District; municipally, a part of Vysokoye Rural Settlement of that district
Vysokoye, Meshchovsky District, Kaluga Oblast, a village in Meshchovsky District
Vysokoye, Mosalsky District, Kaluga Oblast, a village in Mosalsky District

Khanty-Mansi Autonomous Okrug
As of 2010, one urban locality in Khanty-Mansi Autonomous Okrug bears this name:
Vysoky, Khanty-Mansi Autonomous Okrug, an urban-type settlement under the administrative jurisdiction of the town of okrug significance of Megion

Kirov Oblast
As of 2010, one rural locality in Kirov Oblast bears this name:
Vysokaya, Kirov Oblast, a village in Vysokoramensky Rural Okrug of Shabalinsky District

Kostroma Oblast
As of 2010, two rural localities in Kostroma Oblast bear this name:
Vysokoye, Kostroma Oblast, a village in Vlasovskoye Settlement of Oktyabrsky District
Vysokaya, Kostroma Oblast, a village in Medveditskoye Settlement of Pavinsky District

Krasnodar Krai
As of 2010, three rural localities in Krasnodar Krai bear this name:
Vysoky, Kurganinsky District, Krasnodar Krai, a settlement in Novoalekseyevsky Rural Okrug of Kurganinsky District
Vysoky, Mostovsky District, Krasnodar Krai, a khutor under the administrative jurisdiction of Mostovskoy Settlement Okrug of Mostovsky District
Vysokoye, Krasnodar Krai, a selo in Moldovsky Rural Okrug under the administrative jurisdiction of the City of Sochi

Kursk Oblast
As of 2010, two rural localities in Kursk Oblast bear this name:
Vysokoye, Glushkovsky District, Kursk Oblast, a selo in Nizhnemordoksky Selsoviet of Glushkovsky District
Vysokoye, Medvensky District, Kursk Oblast, a selo in Vysoksky Selsoviet of Medvensky District

Republic of Mordovia
As of 2010, three rural localities in the Republic of Mordovia bear this name:
Vysokoye, Kovylkinsky District, Republic of Mordovia, a selo in Pokrovsky Selsoviet of Kovylkinsky District
Vysokoye, Temnikovsky District, Republic of Mordovia, a village in Babeyevsky Selsoviet of Temnikovsky District
Vysokaya, Republic of Mordovia, a village under the administrative jurisdiction of the work settlement of Kadoshkino in Kadoshkinsky District

Moscow Oblast
As of 2010, two rural localities in Moscow Oblast bear this name:
Vysokoye, Mozhaysky District, Moscow Oblast, a village in Zamoshinskoye Rural Settlement of Mozhaysky District
Vysokoye, Shakhovskoy District, Moscow Oblast, a village in Seredinskoye Rural Settlement of Shakhovskoy District

Murmansk Oblast
As of 2010, one rural locality in Murmansk Oblast bears this name:
Vysoky, Murmansk Oblast, an inhabited locality under the administrative jurisdiction of Olenegorsk Town with Jurisdictional Territory

Nizhny Novgorod Oblast
As of 2010, one rural locality in Nizhny Novgorod Oblast bears this name:
Vysokaya, Nizhny Novgorod Oblast, a village in Kuznetsovsky Selsoviet of Chkalovsky District

Novgorod Oblast
As of 2012, six rural localities in Novgorod Oblast bear this name:
Vysokoye, Chudovsky District, Novgorod Oblast, a village in Tregubovskoye Settlement of Chudovsky District
Vysokoye, Krasnoborskoye Settlement, Kholmsky District, Novgorod Oblast, a village in Krasnoborskoye Settlement of Kholmsky District
Vysokoye, Togodskoye Settlement, Kholmsky District, Novgorod Oblast, a village in Togodskoye Settlement of Kholmsky District
Vysokoye, Moshenskoy District, Novgorod Oblast, a village in Orekhovskoye Settlement of Moshenskoy District
Vysokoye, Nagovskoye Settlement, Starorussky District, Novgorod Oblast, a village in Nagovskoye Settlement of Starorussky District
Vysokoye, Velikoselskoye Settlement, Starorussky District, Novgorod Oblast, a village in Velikoselskoye Settlement of Starorussky District

Oryol Oblast
As of 2010, nine rural localities in Oryol Oblast bear this name:
Vysoky, Berezovsky Selsoviet, Dmitrovsky District, Oryol Oblast, a settlement in Berezovsky Selsoviet of Dmitrovsky District
Vysoky, Dolbenkinsky Selsoviet, Dmitrovsky District, Oryol Oblast, a settlement in Dolbenkinsky Selsoviet of Dmitrovsky District
Vysoky, Kromskoy District, Oryol Oblast, a settlement in Apalkovsky Selsoviet of Kromskoy District
Vysokoye, Mtsensky District, Oryol Oblast, a village in Vysokinsky Selsoviet of Mtsensky District
Vysokoye, Orlovsky District, Oryol Oblast, a village in Stanovskoy Selsoviet of Orlovsky District
Vysokoye, Pokrovsky District, Oryol Oblast, a village in Verkhnezhernovsky Selsoviet of Pokrovsky District
Vysokoye, Shablykinsky District, Oryol Oblast, a selo in Kosulichesky Selsoviet of Shablykinsky District
Vysokoye, Trosnyansky District, Oryol Oblast, a selo in Pennovsky Selsoviet of Trosnyansky District
Vysokoye, Znamensky District, Oryol Oblast, a village in Uzkinsky Selsoviet of Znamensky District

Penza Oblast
As of 2010, one rural locality in Penza Oblast bears this name:
Vysokoye, Penza Oblast, a selo in Vysokinsky Selsoviet of Bashmakovsky District

Primorsky Krai
As of 2010, one rural locality in Primorsky Krai bears this name:
Vysokoye, Primorsky Krai, a selo in Chernigovsky District

Pskov Oblast
As of 2010, five rural localities in Pskov Oblast bear this name:
Vysokoye, Dedovichsky District, Pskov Oblast, a village in Dedovichsky District
Vysokoye, Nevelsky District, Pskov Oblast, a village in Nevelsky District
Vysokoye, Novorzhevsky District, Pskov Oblast, a village in Novorzhevsky District
Vysokoye, Opochetsky District, Pskov Oblast, a village in Opochetsky District
Vysokoye, Strugo-Krasnensky District, Pskov Oblast, a village in Strugo-Krasnensky District

Rostov Oblast
As of 2010, one rural locality in Rostov Oblast bears this name:
Vysoky, Rostov Oblast, a settlement in Tyulpanovskoye Rural Settlement of Zavetinsky District

Ryazan Oblast
As of 2010, seven rural localities in Ryazan Oblast bear this name:
Vysokoye, Pitelinsky District, Ryazan Oblast, a selo in Novounkorsky Rural Okrug of Pitelinsky District
Vysokoye, Ryazansky District, Ryazan Oblast, a selo in Vysokovsky Rural Okrug of Ryazansky District
Vysokoye, Rybnovsky District, Ryazan Oblast, a village in Baturinsky Rural Okrug of Rybnovsky District
Vysokoye, Sarayevsky District, Ryazan Oblast, a selo in Vysokovsky Rural Okrug of Sarayevsky District
Vysokoye, Shatsky District, Ryazan Oblast, a selo in Pechinsky Rural Okrug of Shatsky District
Vysokoye, Skopinsky District, Ryazan Oblast, a selo in Ilyinsky Rural Okrug of Skopinsky District
Vysokoye, Yermishinsky District, Ryazan Oblast, a village in Kafteysky Rural Okrug of Yermishinsky District

Sakhalin Oblast
As of 2010, one rural locality in Sakhalin Oblast bears this name:
Vysokoye, Sakhalin Oblast, a selo in Anivsky District

Samara Oblast
As of 2010, one rural locality in Samara Oblast bears this name:
Vysokoye, Samara Oblast, a selo in Pestravsky District

Saratov Oblast
As of 2010, one rural locality in Saratov Oblast bears this name:
Vysokoye, Saratov Oblast, a selo in Krasnoarmeysky District

Smolensk Oblast
As of 2010, ten rural localities in Smolensk Oblast bear this name:
Vysokoye, Gagarinsky District, Smolensk Oblast, a village in Prechistenskoye Rural Settlement of Gagarinsky District
Vysokoye, Kholm-Zhirkovsky District, Smolensk Oblast, a village in Bogdanovskoye Rural Settlement of Kholm-Zhirkovsky District
Vysokoye, Monastyrshchinsky District, Smolensk Oblast, a village in Tatarskoye Rural Settlement of Monastyrshchinsky District
Vysokoye, Izvekovskoye Rural Settlement, Novoduginsky District, Smolensk Oblast, a village in Izvekovskoye Rural Settlement of Novoduginsky District
Vysokoye, Vysokovskoye Rural Settlement, Novoduginsky District, Smolensk Oblast, a selo in Vysokovskoye Rural Settlement of Novoduginsky District
Vysokoye, Safonovsky District, Smolensk Oblast, a village in Baranovskoye Rural Settlement of Safonovsky District
Vysokoye, Smolensky District, Smolensk Oblast, a village in Kozinskoye Rural Settlement of Smolensky District
Vysokoye, Zakharyevskoye Rural Settlement, Ugransky District, Smolensk Oblast, a village in Zakharyevskoye Rural Settlement of Ugransky District
Vysokoye, Znamenskoye Rural Settlement, Ugransky District, Smolensk Oblast, a village in Znamenskoye Rural Settlement of Ugransky District
Vysokoye, Yelninsky District, Smolensk Oblast, a village in Mutishchenskoye Rural Settlement of Yelninsky District

Sverdlovsk Oblast
As of 2010, one rural locality in Sverdlovsk Oblast bears this name:
Vysoky, Sverdlovsk Oblast, a settlement under the administrative jurisdiction of the Town of Krasnouralsk

Tomsk Oblast
As of 2010, one rural locality in Tomsk Oblast bears this name:
Vysokoye, Tomsk Oblast, a selo in Zyryansky District

Tula Oblast
As of 2010, six rural localities in Tula Oblast bear this name:
Vysoky, Tula Oblast, a settlement in Novopokrovskaya Rural Administration of Chernsky District
Vysokoye, Dubensky District, Tula Oblast, a village in Nadezhdinsky Rural Okrug of Dubensky District
Vysokoye, Leninsky District, Tula Oblast, a selo in Bezhkovsky Rural Okrug of Leninsky District
Vysokoye, Odoyevsky District, Tula Oblast, a village in Okorokovskaya Rural Administration of Odoyevsky District
Vysokoye, Venyovsky District, Tula Oblast, a village in Kozlovsky Rural Okrug of Venyovsky District
Vysokoye, Volovsky District, Tula Oblast, a village in Krasnodubrovsky Rural Okrug of Volovsky District

Tver Oblast
As of 2010, twenty rural localities in Tver Oblast bear this name:
Vysokoye, Kalyazinsky District, Tver Oblast, a village in Kalyazinsky District
Vysokoye, Kesovogorsky District, Tver Oblast, a selo in Kesovogorsky District
Vysokoye (Borkovskoye Rural Settlement), Kuvshinovsky District, Tver Oblast, a village in Kuvshinovsky District; municipally, a part of Borkovskoye Rural Settlement of that district
Vysokoye (Vasilkovskoye Rural Settlement), Kuvshinovsky District, Tver Oblast, a village in Kuvshinovsky District; municipally, a part of Vasilkovskoye Rural Settlement of that district
Vysokoye, Likhoslavlsky District, Tver Oblast, a village in Likhoslavlsky District
Vysokoye (Nelidovskoye Rural Settlement), Nelidovsky District, Tver Oblast, a village in Nelidovsky District; municipally, a part of Nelidovskoye Rural Settlement of that district
Vysokoye (Vysokinskoye Rural Settlement), Nelidovsky District, Tver Oblast, a village in Nelidovsky District; municipally, a part of Vysokinskoye Rural Settlement of that district
Vysokoye (Grishinskoye Rural Settlement), Oleninsky District, Tver Oblast, a village in Oleninsky District; municipally, a part of Grishinskoye Rural Settlement of that district
Vysokoye (Mostovskoye Rural Settlement), Oleninsky District, Tver Oblast, a village in Oleninsky District; municipally, a part of Mostovskoye Rural Settlement of that district
Vysokoye (Gusevskoye Rural Settlement), Oleninsky District, Tver Oblast, a village in Oleninsky District; municipally, a part of Gusevskoye Rural Settlement of that district
Vysokoye, Ostashkovsky District, Tver Oblast, a village in Ostashkovsky District
Vysokoye, Selizharovsky District, Tver Oblast, a village in Selizharovsky District
Vysokoye, Staritsky District, Tver Oblast, a village in Staritsky District
Vysokoye, Toropetsky District, Tver Oblast, a village in Toropetsky District
Vysokoye (settlement), Torzhoksky District, Tver Oblast, a settlement in Torzhoksky District
Vysokoye (village) (Vysokovskoye Rural Settlement), Torzhoksky District, Tver Oblast, a village in Torzhoksky District; municipally, a part of Vysokovskoye Rural Settlement of that district
Vysokoye (village) (Strashevichskoye Rural Settlement), Torzhoksky District, Tver Oblast, a village in Torzhoksky District; municipally, a part of Strashevichskoye Rural Settlement of that district
Vysokoye (village) (Strashevichskoye Rural Settlement), Torzhoksky District, Tver Oblast, a village in Torzhoksky District; municipally, a part of Strashevichskoye Rural Settlement of that district
Vysokoye (Proninskoye Rural Settlement), Vesyegonsky District, Tver Oblast, a village in Vesyegonsky District; municipally, a part of Proninskoye Rural Settlement of that district
Vysokoye (Chamerovskoye Rural Settlement), Vesyegonsky District, Tver Oblast, a village in Vesyegonsky District; municipally, a part of Chamerovskoye Rural Settlement of that district

Vologda Oblast
As of 2010, eleven rural localities in Vologda Oblast bear this name:
Vysokoye, Cherepovetsky District, Vologda Oblast, a village in Dmitriyevsky Selsoviet of Cherepovetsky District
Vysokoye, Ust-Kubinsky District, Vologda Oblast, a settlement in Ustyansky Selsoviet of Ust-Kubinsky District
Vysokoye, Verkhovazhsky District, Vologda Oblast, a village in Naumovsky Selsoviet of Verkhovazhsky District
Vysokaya, Babushkinsky District, Vologda Oblast, a village in Roslyatinsky Selsoviet of Babushkinsky District
Vysokaya, Cherepovetsky District, Vologda Oblast, a village in Ivanovsky Selsoviet of Cherepovetsky District
Vysokaya, Kichmengsko-Gorodetsky District, Vologda Oblast, a village in Kurilovsky Selsoviet of Kichmengsko-Gorodetsky District
Vysokaya, Zavrazhsky Selsoviet, Nikolsky District, Vologda Oblast, a village in Zavrazhsky Selsoviet of Nikolsky District
Vysokaya, Zelentsovsky Selsoviet, Nikolsky District, Vologda Oblast, a village in Zelentsovsky Selsoviet of Nikolsky District
Vysokaya, Sokolsky District, Vologda Oblast, a village in Chuchkovsky Selsoviet of Sokolsky District
Vysokaya, Velikoustyugsky District, Vologda Oblast, a village in Pokrovsky Selsoviet of Velikoustyugsky District
Vysokaya, Vozhegodsky District, Vologda Oblast, a village in Mityukovsky Selsoviet of Vozhegodsky District

Voronezh Oblast
As of 2010, four rural localities in Voronezh Oblast bear this name:
Vysoky, Olkhovatsky District, Voronezh Oblast, a khutor in Karayashnikovskoye Rural Settlement of Olkhovatsky District
Vysoky, Talovsky District, Voronezh Oblast, a settlement in Kamenno-Stepnoye Rural Settlement of Talovsky District
Vysokoye, Liskinsky District, Voronezh Oblast, a selo in Vysokinskoye Rural Settlement of Liskinsky District
Vysokoye, Vorobyovsky District, Voronezh Oblast, a settlement in Muzhichanskoye Rural Settlement of Vorobyovsky District

Renamed localities
Vysokoye, until June 2012, name of the village of Vysokoye 1-ye in Krasnoborskoye Settlement of Kholmsky District of Novgorod Oblast

Abolished localities
Vysokoye, Soletsky District, Novgorod Oblast, a former village in Dubrovskoye Settlement of Soletsky District of Novgorod Oblast; abolished in June 2011